Geraldo Júlio de Mello Filho (born 19 March 1971) is a Brazilian politician and a former mayor of Recife, Pernambuco. He is a member of the Brazilian Socialist Party.

Political career 
Geraldo Júlio de Mello Filho was born in Recife, he acted in the third term of Miguel Arraes's Government of Pernambuco and, in 2000, he was the director of planning of the Administration Secretary of the Prefecture of Recife.
In Eduardo Campos' government, he assumed the office of Planning Secretary in 2007 and, four years later, he was State Secretary of Economic Development.

Julio was a mayoral candidate in the 2012 municipal elections, being elected in the first round with 51,15% of the valid votes, and was re-elected in the 2016 elections.

See also
 List of mayors of Recife

References

1971 births
Living people
Mayors of Recife